Édgar Enrique Fierro Corral (born 22 May 1995) is a Mexican professional footballer who plays as a goalkeeper for Atlético San Luis.

References

1995 births
Living people
Mexican footballers
Association football goalkeepers
Coras de Nayarit F.C. footballers
C.D. Tepatitlán de Morelos players
Atlético San Luis footballers
Ascenso MX players
Liga Premier de México players
Tercera División de México players
Footballers from Durango
People from Santiago Papasquiaro